The Zhytomyr–Berdychiv offensive operation was a part of the strategic offensive of the Red Army in the right-bank (western) Ukrainian SSR, the Dnieper–Carpathian offensive. The successful offensive operation was conducted by the forces of the 1st Ukrainian Front commanded by General of Army Nikolai Vatutin during World War II, from 24 December  through to 14 January 1944.

The task was to defeat the opposing German 4th Panzer Army of Army Group South and advance to the Southern Bug river while preventing new attempts by the enemy to recapture Kiev. After an opening  attack across a 300 kilometer front, Soviet troops advanced from 80 to 200 km and nearly liberated all of the Kiev and Zhytomyr Oblast regions, along with the regions of the Vinnytsa and Rivne Oblasts. The 1st Ukrainian Front gained a position north of the main German forces of Army Group South. The German forces retained the western shore of the Dnieper in the Kaniv region.

Prelude 
As a result of the Kiev strategic offensive operation late in 1943, troops of the 1st Ukrainian Front under Vatutin had taken a large bridgehead on the right bank of the Dnieper in the Kiev region that “overhung” the enemy group of the troops in the south-western Ukraine. In an attempt to reduce the bridgehead and to retake Kiev, German forces counter-attacked in the region south of Zhytomyr.

Manstein brought the 1st Panzer Army up to join the 4th Panzer Army in launching a series of counterattacks against the flanks of the extended Soviet forces. These counterattacks, conducted over the following three weeks, succeeded in creating a series of loosely held pockets, and the Germans began to stabilize their front. The German counterattacks inflicted considerable losses in men and materiel upon the Red Army, and a cohesive defensive position eventually was restored. However the Soviets held a great number of forces in reserve, and the success von Manstein achieved could not last.  The attempt to retake Kiev, in what was called the Kiev Strategic Defensive, had failed.

The Zhitomir–Berdichev offensive 
On 24 December 1943, General Vatutin began his general offensive by launching the attack along the Zhytomyr-Kiev highway and the Fastov-Kazatin railway line with three armies: the 1st Guards Army (Andrei Grechko), the 18th Army (Konstantin Leselidze) and the 38th Army (Kirill Moskalenko). In addition to the Soviet formations and units, the 1st Czechoslovak Brigade also participated in the operation.

The attack, preceded by a powerful initial barrage of artillery, started in the thick fog and took the German troops of the XIII Army Corps and XLII Army Corps by surprise for its suddenness and intensity, and immediately put the deployment of the 4th Panzer Army in peril. Returning hastily to his headquarters in Vinnytsia, Field Marshal von Manstein understood the gravity of the situation and began disengaging the three Panzer-Divisions of General Hermann Balck's XLVIII Panzerkorps, deployed north of the XIII Army Corps, in order to transfer them towards the south and counterattack the Soviet attack wedge on the flank. However, the situation of the German front was already compromised; the Soviet forces were in the process of exploiting the success after breaking through.

During January 1944 the forces of the First Ukrainian Front advanced further to the southwest to Berdychiv (taken on 5 January), towards Vinnytsia and Zhmerynka, but the advance to the Upper Bug was repulsed by German forces and during February the frontline stabilised southwest of Berdychiv and Kazatin.

Results 
All told, in the course of the operation, the Soviets achieved notable success. Having advanced to a depth of 80 to 200 km, they almost completely cleared the German forces from the Kiev and Zhytomyr regions, a number of districts of the Vinnytsa and Rovno regions. The Soviets now dangerously hanged from the north over Army Group South, while the 27th and 40th Armies had deeply enveloped the German troops that continued to hold the right bank of the Dnieper in the area of Kanev. This created the conditions for the subsequent Korsun-Schevchenkovsky Operation.

The blow of the 1st Ukrainian Front was struck at the most sensitive place of Army Group South - its northern flank, which threatened to cut off its main forces from the paths leading to Germany. The 1st and 4th Panzer Armies operating in the front line had suffered serious losses- the 143rd and 147th Reserve Infantry Divisions were disbanded, the 68th Infantry Division due to heavy losses was withdrawn from the front-line and sent to Poland for extensive refits, while 8th Panzer Division, 20th Panzer-Grenadier Division, 112th, 291st and 340th Infantry Divisions were halved in strength. All told, 8 Wehrmacht divisions were either destroyed or halved in strength.

To close the gaps in their defense and to stop the Soviet offensive on this sector, the Germans had to urgently transfer 12 divisions of the 1st Panzer Army from southern Ukraine to this area. The reserves turned out to be almost completely spent, which affected the further course of operations. To parry the subsequent attacks of the Soviet troops, the German command was forced to deploy troops from Western Europe, as well as from Romania, Hungary, Yugoslavia.

Notes and references

See also
 Eastern Front (World War II)
 Timeline of the Eastern Front of World War II

Battles and operations of the Soviet–German War
Military operations of World War II involving Germany